The 2010 FIFA World Cup qualification UEFA Group 1 was a UEFA qualifying group for the 2010 FIFA World Cup. The group comprised 2006 fourth-place finishers Portugal, along with Sweden, Denmark, Hungary, Albania and Malta.

The group was won by Denmark, who qualified for the 2010 FIFA World Cup. The runners-up Portugal entered the UEFA play-off stage.

Standings

Matches
The match schedule was determined on 6 January 2008 at a meeting in Copenhagen, Denmark.

Goalscorers
There were 62 goals scored during the 30 games, an average of 2.06 goals per game.

5 goals
 Søren Larsen

4 goals
 Simão

3 goals
 Erjon Bogdani
 Nicklas Bendtner
 Sándor Torghelle
 Nani
 Olof Mellberg

2 goals

 Christian Poulsen
 Roland Juhász
 Hugo Almeida
 Liédson
 Marcus Berg
 Zlatan Ibrahimović
 Kim Källström

1 goal

 Armend Dallku
 Klodian Duro
 Hamdi Salihi
 Daniel Agger
 Leon Andreasen
 Daniel Jensen
 Thomas Kahlenberg
 Morten Nordstrand
 Jakob Poulsen
 Ákos Buzsáky
 Zoltán Gera
 Tamás Hajnal
 Szabolcs Huszti
 Gergely Rudolf
 Bruno Alves
 Deco
 Edinho
 Miguel Veloso
 Pepe
 Anders Svensson
 Samuel Holmén
 Daniel Majstorović

1 own goal
 Ian Azzopardi (for Sweden)
 Brian Said (playing against Portugal)

Attendances

See also
Denmark–Sweden football rivalry

References

1
FIFA
FIFA
2008–09 in Portuguese football
qual
2008–09 in Danish football
Qual
2008–09 in Albanian football
2009–10 in Albanian football
2008–09 in Maltese football
2009–10 in Maltese football
2008–09 in Hungarian football
2009–10 in Hungarian football